James Randall Rogers (born January 3, 1967) is former Major League Baseball pitcher. He batted and threw right-handed.

Rogers graduated from Webster High School in Tulsa, Oklahoma in 1985 where he was an all-state shortstop. After high school, he played college baseball at Oklahoma's Seminole State College. At Seminole State in 1986, he began pitching full-time and was selected by the Blue Jays in the 16th round of the 1986 Major League Baseball draft. In 1987, he was named to the 1987 ABCA/Rawlings NJCAA Division-I All-America First Team, helped lead Seminole State to the JUCO World Series and was projected as a first round pick in the 1987 draft, he signed with the Blue Jays instead of re-entering the draft.

After his playing career, Rogers spent more than a decade as an assistant coach for the Rogers State Hillcats baseball team.

References

External links

1967 births
Living people
American expatriate baseball players in Canada
Baseball players from Oklahoma
Knoxville Blue Jays players
Knoxville Smokies players
Major League Baseball pitchers
Myrtle Beach Blue Jays players
Rogers State Hillcats baseball coaches
Seminole State Trojans baseball players
Sportspeople from Tulsa, Oklahoma
St. Catharines Blue Jays players	
Syracuse Chiefs players
Toronto Blue Jays players
Webster High School (Tulsa, Oklahoma) alumni